Game of Thrones'' Live Concert Experience is the concert tour by the HBO epic fantasy series Game of Thrones featuring composer Ramin Djawadi. The all-arena tour was announced on August 8, 2016 at an intimate concert in Los Angeles, California. The tour consists of 24 dates in cities across the United States and Canada. The tour's title, "Music Is Coming" is in reference to House Stark motto, "Winter Is Coming." The concert started on February 20, 2017 in Saint Paul, Minnesota and ended April 2 in Portland, Oregon.

A world tour was announced in September 2017. It started in May 2018 in Madrid and ended in October in Toronto. A third tour in North America started on September 5, 2019 finishing on October 5, 2019.

Background

On August 8, 2016, composer Ramin Djawadi announced the Game of Thrones'' Live Concert Experience Tour at an event at the Hollywood Palladium in Los Angeles with Isaac Hempstead Wright, who plays Bran Stark in the series. The tour started in Saint Paul, Minnesota and concluded in Portland, Oregon. The tour consisted of 24 cities across the United States, with additional stops in Toronto, Ontario and Montreal, Quebec in Canada.

The tour featured the show's composer, Ramin Djawadi, conducting an 80-piece orchestra and choir, which performed highlights from the series' musical score, on a 360-degree stage. In addition, LED telescoping and wall screens, and special 3D designs, rose from the stage floor. Instruments were specially created for the tour, such as a 14-foot Wildling horn played during the Wildling attack on the Wall section.

We really want to summarize the show the best we can, There's a lot of different locations and events to cover. If you come and watch this concert, you really get a nice summary and a nice look back on the past seasons. The one I'm really excited about is 'Light of the Seven,' which was such a great surprise to the viewers, because it's the first time we're using piano, Besides the orchestra and the choir, we will have the piano and that piece to play. That'll be really great live. - Ramin Djawadi

In an interview, Djawadi talked about the tour, saying, "I'm going through the music to adapt it more for a live performance, and I might have a vocalist on a piece that didn't have one before, or lengthen another piece, I'm not bound to the picture anymore, so I can let the music tell its own story, and be creative about it."

Stage

The concert contained multiple stages and the main stage (King's Landing stage), and featured Djawadi as conductor with the orchestra and choir. On the other side of the stage (Winterfell stage) were another choir and more soloists. In between those stages were four smaller stages, with each being named after different locations from the world of Game of Thrones. There was also a runway between the two main stages, that was also a location.

Setlist 

This setlist was performed at the October 6, 2018 concert held at Allstate Arena in Rosemont. It does not represent all shows throughout the tour.

First set

 "Game of Thrones Theme"
 "House Themes: Medley"
 "Goodbye Brother"
 "Love in the Eyes"
 "Finale"
 "The Red Woman"
 "Wildfire"
 "The Rains of Castamere"
 "The Lannisters Send Their Regards"
 "Whitewalkers"
 "You Know Nothing"
 "Needle"
 "Dracarys"
 "Mhysa"

Second set

 "The Children"
 "High Sparrow"
 "Atonement"
 "Reign"
 "My Watch Has Ended"
 "Hold the Door"
 "Let's Play a Game"
 "Bastard"
 "Trust Each Other"
 "Light of the Seven"
 "The Winds of Winter"
 "Home"
 "I Am the Storm"
 "The Queen's Justice"
 "The Spoils of War"
 "Truth"
 "Winter Is Here"
 "The Army of the Dead"

Encore

 "Game of Thrones Theme"

Shows

Dates performed

Dates cancelled

Reception 
The concert has received positive reviews.

See also
 Music of Game of Thrones

References

External links
  – official Live Nation tour site
  - official concert site

2017 concert tours
2018 concert tours
2019 concert tours
Ramin Djawadi concert tours
Live Concert Experience